Kevin Javier Hernández Hernández (born July 17, 1999) is a Puerto Rican football player who currently plays as a forward for Peoria City.

Career statistics

International

References

External links
 Kevin Hernández at the Assumption University

1999 births
Living people
Assumption University (Worcester) alumni
Assumption Greyhounds men's soccer players
Puerto Rican footballers
Puerto Rico international footballers
Association football forwards
Sportspeople from San Juan, Puerto Rico